The 155th Georgia General Assembly convened its first session by January 14, 2019, at the Georgia State Capitol in Atlanta. The first session lasted for 40 legislative days in early 2019, and a second session began on January 13, 2020. The 155th Georgia General Assembly succeeds the 154th of 2017 and 2018, and precedes the 156th in 2021 and 2022.

The current membership of the General Assembly was elected in the 2018 State Senate and State House elections.

Party composition

Senate

House of Representatives

Officers

Senate

House of Representatives

Members of the State Senate 
The following is a list of members of the Georgia State Senate.

Members of the House of Representatives 
The following is a list of members of the Georgia House of Representatives.

Notes

References

Georgia (U.S. state) legislative sessions
2019 in Georgia (U.S. state)
2020 in Georgia (U.S. state)
2019 U.S. legislative sessions
2020 U.S. legislative sessions